William Newham (12 December 1860 – 26 June 1944) was a cricketer who played first-class cricket for Sussex County Cricket Club. He also played one Test match for England against Australia in 1888.

He was educated at Ardingly College, where he was a member of the cricket eleven. He stayed on there as an assistant master until 1887.

References
Cricinfo page on Billy Newham
CricketArchive page on Billy Newham
Brief profile of William Newham by Don Ambrose
Wisden obituary of Billy Newham

External links

1860 births
People educated at Ardingly College
England Test cricketers
Sussex cricket captains
1944 deaths
Sportspeople from Shrewsbury
Gentlemen cricketers
North v South cricketers
West of England cricketers
East of England cricketers
C. I. Thornton's XI cricketers
Gentlemen of the South cricketers